Paul Daniel Turnbull (born 23 January 1989) is an English footballer who plays as a midfielder for Stockport Town.

Club career

Stockport County
Born in Handforth, Cheshire, Turnbull progressed through the Stockport County Centre of Excellence youth system where he trained as a striker, although he later adapted to playing in the centre of midfield . He became the youngest player to play league football in Stockport County's history, when he came off the bench against Wrexham on 30 April 2005, aged 16 years 97 days and still a school student at Wilmslow High School.

On 21 December 2007, Turnbull extended his contract at Edgeley Park until summer 2009, following a number of regular first team appearances. He started 16 games for Stockport in the 2007–08 season before joining Conference National club Altrincham on loan in March 2008, where he made six appearances. He returned from loan and impressed manager Jim Gannon so much that he played all of the clubs playoff games at the end of the season, including the final at Wembley Stadium.

Turnbull became a regular in the 2008–09 season and scored the first senior goal of his career in Stockport's 3–1 victory over Oldham Athletic on 3 October 2008.

In the 2010–11 season he was made club captain by Stockport manager Paul Simpson at the age of 21.

Northampton Town
In May 2011 he was offered a new one-year deal by the club although in June 2011 Stockport agreed a fee with Northampton Town and agreed permission for Turnbull to talk to the club, with a view to agreeing personal terms and on 29 June the club confirmed he had signed for Northampton.

On 23 January 2012 he rejoined Stockport County on loan. On 21 September 2012 he rejoined Stockport County again on loan until 22 December. In January 2013, he joined Lincoln City on loan for the remainder of the season.

Macclesfield Town
In July 2013 he joined Macclesfield Town after being released by Northampton Town.

Barrow

After refusing a new contract at Macclesfield Town, Turnbull joined Barrow on 7 June 2016.

Chester
In July 2017 he joined Chester on a two-year deal, but off the field money issues at Chester meant Paul cut his spell their short.

Stockport County
Paul rejoined his boyhood team Stockport County and was a crucial part of their 2018/2019 National League North winning campaign.

Later career
After leaving Stockport County, Paul joined National League North Curzon Ashton for the 2020/21 season, before joining Stockport Town in North West Counties Division One South in July 2021.

Career statistics

Honours
Stockport County
 Football League Two play-offs (1): 2007–08
National League North Champions (1): 2018-19

References

External links
 

1989 births
People from Handforth
Living people
English footballers
Association football midfielders
Stockport County F.C. players
Altrincham F.C. players
Northampton Town F.C. players
Lincoln City F.C. players
Macclesfield Town F.C. players
Barrow A.F.C. players
Chester F.C. players
English Football League players
National League (English football) players
Sportspeople from Cheshire
Curzon Ashton F.C. players
Stockport Town F.C. players